XHPR-FM in Veracruz, Veracruz, Mexico is a radio station broadcasting on 101.7 FM. It is known as Soy FM.

History

XHPR began operations on 101.3 MHz some time after receiving its concession in 1965. It was owned by Emmy Pinto Reyes, who also obtained the original concession for XHEM-FM in Ciudad Juárez.

The station moved to 101.7 MHz in 1999 (though authorization was given in May 2005) in order to avoid interference to other radio stations.

In 2016, a sale to Grupo Radio Digital by the previous owners, Grupo FM Multimedios, prompted a format change to Ke Buena, which lasted just months before another format change, back to pop. The station has been known as Pop FM, Soy Pop FM, and Soy 101.7 since returning to the format.

References

1965 establishments in Mexico
Radio stations established in 1965
Radio stations in Veracruz
Spanish-language radio stations
Tropical music radio stations